The CAF Team of the Year is an annual football award given by the Confederation of African Football during the CAF Awards.

In 2007, the CAF did not choose the team of the year, but rather the best ten players of the last fifty years. The ten players chosen were Mahmoud El Khatib and Hossam Hassan of Egypt, Roger Milla and Samuel Eto'o of Cameroon, Abedi Pele of Ghana, Kalusha Bwalya of Zambia, George Weah of Liberia, Rabah Madjer of Algeria, Didier Drogba of the Ivory Coast, and Nwankwo Kanu of Nigeria.

2005

Source:

2006

Source:

2008

Source:

2009

Source:

2010

Source:

2011

Source:

2012

Source:

2013

Source:

2014

Source:

2015

Substitutes

Source:

2016

Substitutes

Source:

2017

Source:

2018

Source:

2019

Source:

Most appearances

References

African football trophies and awards
Confederation of African Football trophies and awards]